Critical Asian Studies is a quarterly peer-reviewed academic journal covering research for understanding the Asia and Pacific regions, the world, and ourselves. It was articulated in 1967 by Committee of Concerned Asian Scholars, a group that coalesced around young scholarly opposition to US involvement in the Vietnam War. From 1968 until 2001 it was published under the name of Bulletin of Concerned Asian Scholars in Asian studies. In the estimation of Fabio Lanza, the journal was at its inception "radical, vibrant, at times excessive, and always politically minded.

According to the Journal Citation Reports, the journal has a 2021 impact factor of 3.053. The editor-in-chief is Robert J Shepherd (George Washington University).

Abstracting and indexing 
The journal is abstracted and indexed in:
 GEOBASE
 Scopus
 MLA - Modern Language Association Database
 Worldwide Political Science Abstracts
 Historical Abstracts

External links

References

Publications established in 1969
Asian studies journals
Taylor & Francis academic journals